Selegie House is a public housing complex which includes blocks 8-10 along Selegie Road in Singapore.

History
Construction of the complex began in 1962, costing $3.8 million, and included 151,212 people, and used materials from local quarries. The complex included three larger blocks, with the tallest being twenty stories high, which made it the tallest mix-used development in Singapore at the time of its opening. The blocks were originally interlinked by four roles of two-storey blocks which were later demolished. The tallest block included a glass enclosure at the twentieth floor for sightseeing. The complex was scheduled to be opened on 1 June 1963. However, the complex was opened by Prime Minister Lee Kuan Yew on 31 May instead. The complex was built next to the Selegie Integrated Primary School, which was the tallest school in Singapore at the time, and was originally situated in the Kandang Kerbau district. The rents flats in the complex costed $120 per month at the time of its opening. However, the complex did not include a car park.

By the 1970s, the tallest block had gained a reputation as a "suicide block", as it was the site of many deaths by suicide, which was due to the building's height. By the 1980s, many residents of the complex had begun moving out, as other complexes offered better amenities. In May 1998, a majority of residents of the complex voted for upgrades and better amenities for the complex. In 2003, the complex received a new gateway, drop-off porches, a playground, sheltered walkways and a pavilion.

References

Buildings and structures in Singapore
1963 establishments in Singapore